The Grullon GT is a sports car manufactured by DDR Motorsport Miami Inc. in Miami, Florida, United States. The design is mid engined, rear wheel drive layout, with a tubular steel space frame chassis and composite body.

DDR Motorsport was founded in 2001 by Diego Grullón. DDR made his debut launching the DDR SP4 "Sport Prototype 4 cylinder" at the 2005 Knott's Berry Farm kit car show in California.

The two main models are, the Miami GT8 "Gran Turismo 8 Cylinder" which is powered by a Corvette's GM LS-series engine, and will use either a Porsche G50, G96 or Audi 5000 transaxle, and the GT4 "Gran Turismo 4 cylinder", powered by the Toyota 2.0 liter turbo 3S-GTE engine used in the SW-20 Toyota MR2.

There are 2 models by special order. The SP-RE "Sport Prototype Rotary Engine" with a Mazda RX-7 engine, using a Porsche G50 transaxle coupled with a KEP adaptor plate. The other model is the DDR SP-BE "DDR Sport Prototype Boxer Engine" using a Subaru engine and transaxle.

The cars manufactured by DDR Motorsport are primarily sold as components. Turnkeys are available from DDR too, although built by third parties.

External links
 DDR Motorsport official website
Kitcarplant Article (French)
Kit Car Magazine Article
Auto und Motor Sport Magazine Article
Auto Spy Korea
List of Manufactures, Builders & Dealers
Top Speed website about DDR sp4
Top Speed website about DDR Miami GT
DDR flickr photostream
DDR facebook Official Page
Miami GT Article and Commercial in German

Kit car manufacturers
Kit cars
Motor vehicle manufacturers based in Florida
Car manufacturers of the United States